Alahis (or Alagis) (fl. 680–689) was the Arian duke of Trent and Brescia before becoming king of the Lombards after his successful rebellion in 688.  He did not rule long, however. 

His first rebellion against King Perctarit failed in 680, but the king captured, pardoned, and released him. He rebelled again in 688 when Perctarit's son Cunipert succeeded. He forced Cunipert to a castle on an island in the middle of Lake Como, but his rule was burdensome and tyrannical, and so he lost the support of the people.  Finally, in 689, Cunipert issued forth with the men of Piedmont and defeated Alahis and the men of Venetia at the Battle of Coronate, on the Horn of the Adda, near Lodi.  Alahis was defeated and slain in battle.

References

Gwatkin, H. M., Whitney, J. P., edd. The Cambridge Medieval History: Volume II—The Rise of the Saracens and the Foundations of the Western Empire. Cambridge University Press, 1926.

689 deaths
7th-century Lombard monarchs
7th-century Arian Christians
Lombard warriors
Year of birth unknown
Agilolfings
Monarchs killed in action